Les copains du dimanche ('Sunday's Friends') is a 1958 film which stars Jean Paul Belmondo. It was directed by Henri Aisner. The film promoted the trade union movement and was not seen in commercial cinemas.

Plot 
Trebois, a young laborer, is looking for something to occupy his Sundays, "a glorious activity to make the six working days fly by." He's tired of camping with his friends. One day, in the cafeteria, Casti's friend suggested that he join a flying club. After the flight, Trebois decides that he experienced the best moments of his life in the air. By chance, in the hangar, his friends saw an airplane that had been in an accident. Now restoring it and flying again becomes the meaning of his life.

Cast 

 Jean-Paul Belmondo as Trébois
 Marc Cassot as René Casti
 Yves Deniaud as Manaquin
 Marcel Perès as Bellac
 Paul Bisciglia as Lucien
 Paul Frankeur as Mr. Larcheron
 Michel Piccoli as the director of the aeroclub
 Robert Le Fort as Lemoine
 Julien Bertheau as Jean Raymond, known as "Raf"
 Évelyne Ker as Monique
 Sophie Sel as Mounette
 Germaine Michel as the mother Trébois
 Clément Thierry as the young bourgeois
 Georges Baconnet as the secretary of the committee
 Pierre Vernier as worker fitter
 Jacques Ferrière as Gilbert
 Bernard Fresson as worker in the canteen
 Annette Poivre as a lady at the inauguration

References

External links

Film page at Le Film Guide

1958 films
1958 comedy films
French comedy films
1950s French films
1950s French-language films